Metasia cuencalis is a species of moth in the family Crambidae. It is found in France, Spain and Portugal, as well as in North Africa, including Morocco.

The wingspan is about 20 mm.

References

Moths described in 1894
Metasia
Moths of Europe